NFFF may refer to:

National Fantasy Fan Federation, science fiction fan organization founded in 1941
National Federation of Fish Friers, British trade association
National Fallen Firefighters Foundation, American organization